Kuakata Beach is a beach situated in Kuakata, Patuakhali District, Bangladesh. Its length is 18 km.

It is known as "Sagor Konya" (Daughter of Sea). It is one of top tourist attraction in Bangladesh but due to pollution, uncontrolled tourism and other issues Kuakata Beach is losing its beauty.

Gallery

See also 
 List of beaches in Bangladesh

References

External Links

Beaches of Bangladesh
Tourism in Bangladesh
Tourist attractions in Bangladesh
Seaside resorts in Bangladesh
Patuakhali District
Coordinates on Wikidata